N8-acetylspermidine oxidase (propane-1,3-diamine-forming) is an enzyme with systematic name N8-acetylspermidine:oxygen oxidoreductase (propane-1,3-diamine-forming). This enzyme catalyses the following chemical reaction

 N8-acetylspermidine + O2 + H2O  propane-1,3-diamine +  4-acetamidobutanal + H2O2

This enzyme is also active n N1-acetylspermine, and it has weak activity on N1,N12-diacetylspermine.

References

External links 
 

EC 1.5.3